Divine Meditations may refer to:

Divine Meditations, 1572 work by Thomas Palfreyman
Divine Meditations, 1622 series of poems by John Hagthorpe
Divine Meditations, alternate title for the Holy Sonnets by John Donne

See also
Three Decads of Diuine Meditations, 1630 work by Alexander Ross (writer)
Divine Meditations upon Several Occasions, anthology of works by William Waller
The Art of Divine Meditation,  1634 work by Edmund Calamy the Elder
Meditation (disambiguation)